HD 82943 c is an extrasolar planet approximately 89 light-years away in the constellation of Hydra.  The planet was announced in 2001 to be orbiting the yellow dwarf star HD 82943.  The planet is the innermost planet of two.

See also 
 HD 82943 b

References

External links 
 
 

Hydra (constellation)
Exoplanets discovered in 2001
Giant planets
Exoplanets detected by radial velocity